Jacob Berthelsen (born 4 July 1986) is a retired Danish professional football player.

Berthelsen debuted for Brøndby's first team 20 September 2006 against Brønshøj in the Danish Cup.

References

External links 
 Danish national team profile
 Official Danish Superliga stats
 Jacob Berthelsen at Soccerway

1986 births
Living people
Danish men's footballers
Brøndby IF players
AC Horsens players
Danish Superliga players
Association football defenders
People from Frederikssund Municipality
Frederikssund IK players
Sportspeople from the Capital Region of Denmark